The Jhen Wen Academy is a former tutorial academy in Xiluo Township, Yunlin County, Taiwan.

History
The academies was originally built in 1797 as Wen Chang Temple to worship five major heavenly emperors of learning during the Qing Dynasty rule of Taiwan. It was the place where Jhen Wen Club was established for scholars to study about poetry. In 1812, an academy for classical learning was proposed and it was completed one year later and renamed Jhen Wen Academy. On 8 October 1979, the place was listed as national class 3 historic spot by the Ministry of the Interior and became a historic monument in 1985. Renovation was made for the great gate which was finished in 1989.

Architecture
The academy has only two layers. The main hall and the wing room are made of bricks. The statues on the roof have shapes of flowers and birds. Stony drums are put in front of the middle door and act as one part of foundation of pillars. Sculptures can be divided into stone carving and wood carving.

See also
 Academies (Shuyuan)
 List of tourist attractions in Taiwan

References

1797 establishments in Taiwan
Academies in Taiwan
Buildings and structures completed in 1797
Buildings and structures in Yunlin County
Tourist attractions in Yunlin County